ShowBox is an Indian Hindi music channel that is owned by IN10 Media Network. This is free-to-air channel. This channel shows Bollywood, Punjabi and Haryanvi songs.

Programming 
Breakless Blockbuster
Yo! Wassup
Chakvi Beat De Wakhra Swag
Trending Tunes
Star Swag
Tau Ki Playlist
1 Se Baje 2
Hangout
Star Selfie
Aashiqui Reloaded
Kadak DJ
Raat Ka Adda
Akaal Talks
Music Box Office
The Weekend Show
Swag Star
The Projection Room

References 

Hindi-language television channels in India
Television channels and stations established in 2019
Hindi-language television stations
Television stations in Mumbai
IN10 Media Network
Music television channels in India